Nižná Polianka is a village and municipality in Bardejov District in the Prešov Region of north-east Slovakia.

History
In historical records the village was first mentioned in 1435

Geography
The municipality lies at an altitude of 395 metres and covers an area of 5.876 km².
It has a population of about 252 people.

Media (foto, audio, documents)

References

External links
 
 
https://web.archive.org/web/20070513023228/http://www.statistics.sk/mosmis/eng/run.html
 :sk:Nižná Polianka

Villages and municipalities in Bardejov District
Šariš